Gotthardt Wedig (1583 – 1641) was a 17th-century German painter.

Wedig was born in Cologne as the grandson of Barthel Bruyn the Younger who probably taught him to paint. He is known for portraits and still lifes. His first name is spelled  in various ways and some sources refer to him as "G. von Wedig" of "G. de Wedig". He is known for portraits and still life paintings that he signed with a monogram "GDW".

Portraits:

Still-lifes:

References 

 138781 painting record in the RKD

1583 births
1641 deaths
Artists from Cologne
17th-century German painters